Myrmecia rubicunda is an Australian ant which belongs to the genus Myrmecia. This species is native to Australia. They are rarely seen outside the state of South Australia.

Myrmecia rubicunda is a small bull ant species. Mandibles and labrum are a yellow colour, all legs are reddish. The head and thorax are of a darker brown like colour and the middle of the body is a tan brown colour.

References

Myrmeciinae
Hymenoptera of Australia
Insects described in 1943
Insects of Australia